The Society of Consumer Affairs Professionals in Business, also known as SOCAP International, is a trade organization which represents the profession of customer care across all industries. It was founded in 1973.

SOCAP (Society of Consumer Affairs Professionals) is a non-profit trade association, governed by a Board of Directors and a set of bylaws.  SOCAP exists to provide members with a resource for industry education and networking among colleagues.  SOCAP conducts two annual Symposiums featuring nationally known speakers and authors, virtual and in-person community meetings, educational workshops and other member exchanges.   Timely Topics is a virtual monthly discussion on the latest issues. Tech Tuesday is a virtual technology expo where technology partners can demonstrate their products.  Business Partner Spotlights are a forum for service partners to demonstrate their expertise.  Industry Communities for Auto, Retail, Consumer Packaged Goods and Healthcare are forums where members learn and discuss the specific issues and best practices related to their communities. Group bulletin boards enable quick and direct communication between members. Four Regional Communities offer virtual and in-person events providing members with local networking opportunities and education from expert speakers. A Business Partner Directory is available to connect members to the technology and service partners in the customer care industry. The current CEO of SOCAP is Marie Shubin.  The Chairmen of the Board is Jon Cox, of the Wellness Pet Company.  For more information and to see benefits and membership rates, visit the website at www.socap.org.

References

Organizations established in 1973